Gregory River may refer to:

 Gregory River (Australia), a river that flows into the Gulf of Carpentaria
 Gregory River, Queensland (Bundaberg Region), a locality in Australia
 Gregory River, Queensland (Whitsunday Region), a locality in Australia